Frances Lynn is an English journalist and author.

Biography
Lynn was born in St. Mary's Hospital, Paddington in London, and was educated at Malvern Girls' College.

In 1977, Lynn started her journalistic career when she became the film editor and gossip columnist for the now defunct Ritz Newspaper, published by David Bailey. Interview subjects included Frank Zappa.  She also wrote the initial treatment, entitled Frantic: A Story About a Gossip Columnist, whose characters included a certain Romo Dolonski, a Polish film director out on bail for abducting a 12-year-old girl, for Don Boyd's abortive 1982 film Gossip.

During the 1990s Lynn contributed stories (seven Future Shocks and one Dragon Tales) to 2000 AD.

In 2006, her two novels, Crushed and Frantic, were both published by Eiworth Publishing.

In 2010 Willing To Die For It, her biography of Dr Sammy Lee, was published by Murray Print.

References

External links
 A Readerviews book review of Crushed

English writers
British writers of young adult literature
British journalists
British women journalists
People from Paddington
Living people
Year of birth missing (living people)
English comics writers
Gossip columnists
People educated at Malvern St James
English women writers
British women columnists
Women biographers
Women writers of young adult literature
British female comics artists
Female comics writers